Zone 86 is a zone in the municipality of Al-Shahaniya in the state of Qatar. The main district recorded in the 2015 population census was Dukhan. 

Other districts which fall within its administrative boundaries are Al Khattiya, Al Ruwais West, and Al Zeghain.

Demographics
As of the 2010 census, the zone comprised 1,908 housing units and 147 establishments. There were 11,520 people living in the zone, of which 80% were male and 20% were female. Out of the 11,520 inhabitants, 83% were 20 years of age or older and 17% were under the age of 20. The literacy rate stood at 99.4%.

Employed persons made up 76% of the total population. Females accounted for 6% of the working population, while males accounted for 94% of the working population.

Land use
The Ministry of Municipality and Environment (MME) breaks down land use in the zone as follows.

References 

Zones of Qatar
Al-Shahaniya